Skupski is a surname. Notable people with the surname include:

Ken Skupski (born 1983), British tennis player
Neal Skupski (born 1989), British tennis player, younger brother of Ken

Polish-language surnames